Muazzam Beg (born 18 April 1978) is an Indian Bollywood film writer and director.

Beg was born in Shahjahanpur of Uttar Pradesh state of India. He is a graduate of Jamia Millia Islamia, New Delhi. He started his career as an in-house writer in under director Subhash Ghai's production house Mukta Arts.

His first independent work was as dialogue writer of the 2007 film Swami, starring Manoj Bajpayee and Juhi Chawla in lead roles. The screenplay was co-written with Bhavani Ayyer, writer of Black (2005).

His debut as a solo writer came in the 2008 film, Money Hai Toh Honey Hai.

Along with director Imtiaz Ali, Beg co-wrote the 2011 film Rockstar which earned him wide critical reception and Zee Cine Award 2011.

In 2012, Beg came up with his directorial debut film Sadda Adda, a teen-comedy of six bachelors.

In 2013 he announced his new project titled Munna Bhai, Sallu Bhai – Killers or Healers which would be a docu-drama of the lives of actors Sanjay Dutt and Salman Khan. The film will be produced by Beg under his NGO banner "Indian Film Fraternity".

Early life
Beg, an alumnus of St. Paul's High School, Shahjahanpur, U.P., has been actively involved in theatre and writing since his school days. His initial brush with theatre was during his school days when he started acting in stage plays. Bitten by the creativity bug, he joined a theatre group in Shahjahanpur and started acting in stage plays while he was a student. From acting, he progressed toward writing and directing plays which also marked his initial foray into the creative world.

In 1996, Beg co-founded a theatre group ABHIVYAKTI Natya Manch in his home town with fellow theatre friends. The group staged their first play Aakhiri Salaam based on the life of Freedom Fighter Ashfaqulla Khan. Buoyed by its success, they followed it up with Antrim Yudh based on the life of Shaheed Bhagat Singh as well as Gandhi ne Kaha Tha based on Gandhian philosophy. These plays were written and directed by famous play writer Rajesh Kumar.

In 1997, he moved to Delhi to pursue his graduation in Economics (Honours) from Jamia Millia Islamia University in New Delhi. Simultaneously he continued his passion in creative arts by becoming a member of the Jamia Drama Club and participated in Inter University competitions for two consecutive years. While at Jamia he also served as an active member of the student body of National Social Service (NSS). Jamia was where he got introduced to the craft of film making when he opted to pursue a course in Mass Communication. This ignited his passion for writing and film making and he moved to Mumbai to pursue his dreams.

Career
Beg started his career in Bollywood as an in-house writer for Mukta Arts under the aegis of the legendary film maker Subhash Ghai. Apart from working closely with Ghai, Beg had the fortune of learning the art of screenplay writing under the guidance of the industry's veteran screenwriters: Shabd Kumar and Sachin Bhowmick.

Career graph

Writer
 Critically acclaimed film Swami starring Manoj Bajpayee and Juhi Chawla was Muazzam Beg's first independent movie as a writer. He shared the screenplay credit with Bhavani Iyer (writer of Sanjay Leela Bhasali's Black).
 Money Hai Toh Honey Hai (2008) starring Govinda, Manoj Bajpayee, Aftab Shivdasani, Hansika Motwani, Upen Patel, Ravi Kishan and Celina Jaitley and jointly produced by Eros International and Kumar Mangat was Muazzam Beg's first movie as a solo writer.
 Ranbir Kapoor, Nargis Fakhri starrer Rockstar (2011) earned him wide critical reception and his first award (Zee Cine Award). A semi-autobiographical account of a musician who finds success after a heartbreak was appreciated by critics and audience for Beg's innovative story.

Director / Producer
 Sadda Adda (2012) marked Beg’s directorial debut in Bollywood. This critically acclaimed movie, though initially unnoticed, went on to be considered as one of the best youth comedies revolving around college campuses in recent times.
 2013 marked a new beginning for Beg when he donned the producer’s mantle and started his production house, Hindustan Light and Sound Movie Service which will produce his latest directorial venture Munna Bhai Sallu Bhai. This film is designed to be a cinematic ode to superstars Sanjay Dutt and Salman Khan and will also mark the first congregation of 25,000 die-hard fans for a movie. It was scheduled to be may be released in the third quarter of 2014.

Festival
Along with the movie the director is organising a one-of-a-kind festival during this winter. A melodromantic saga of love, the Bollywoodland will be a festival by, of and for die-hard fans. This festival aims to unite fans across India to celebrate their love and passion for all things Bollywood. The inaugural ceremony will attract 25,000-odd fans across the nation.

The live action from this festival will be captured by multiple cameras placed at strategic locations across the site, very similar to a television reality show. An edited ten-minute footage of the festival thus captured will be included in Muazzam Beg’s directorial venture, Munna Bhai Sallu Bhai thus giving a once-in-a-lifetime opportunity for 25,000 fans to live their Bollywood dreams. The festival will provide a mind-blowing experience to the visitors with its innovative décor, ambience, enchanting acts, and performances. The Bollywoodland will provide opportunities for talented youngsters to get a foothold in the industry by conducting contests and shows. The festival would provide the perfect platform for talented aspirants across the nation to perform and showcase their skills to a large audience and to people from the film industry.

Filmography
 2007 – Swami as co-writer
 2008 – Money Hai Toh Honey Hai as writer
 2011 – Rockstar as co-writer
 2012 – Sadda Adda as writer, director
 Upcoming – Munna Bhai, Sallu Bhai – Killers or Healers as writer, director, producer

Awards
Zee Cine Award
Won
2011: Zee Cine Award Best Screenplay – Rockstar

References

External links
 
 Bollywoodland Festival
 https://www.facebook.com/Thebollywoodland
 Web site

Hindi-language film directors
Film directors from Uttar Pradesh
Film producers from Uttar Pradesh
1978 births
Living people